"Fire and Ice" is a song written by Sharon den Adel, Robert Westerholt and Martijn Spierenburg for the album The Unforgiving (2011). The music video was released on YouTube on December 20, 2011 and it was used to promote Within Temptation's The Unforgiving Tour (2011-2012).

Music video
Besides some live footage from Within Temptation's performing on the Lowlands music festival, the music video follows the story of a fallen angel who becomes a human due to its weakness on fighting and suffers from it.

Notes
The footage used to tell the music video history is the same used at the screen on the tour shows.

References

2011 songs
Within Temptation songs
Songs written by Sharon den Adel
Songs written by Robert Westerholt
Songs written by Martijn Spierenburg
Heavy metal ballads